Zinaida Stepanovna Amosova (born 12 January 1950 in Krupskaya kolkhoz, Talaz District, Dzhambul Oblast, Kazakh SSR) is a former Soviet cross-country skier who competed from 1976 to 1983, training at the Armed Forces sports society in Novosibirsk. She won a gold medal in the 4 × 5 km relay at the 1976 Winter Olympics in Innsbruck.

Amosova's biggest success was at the 1978 FIS Nordic World Ski Championships where she earned three medals. This included two golds (10 km, 20 km) and one bronze (4 × 5 km).

Amosova was awarded Order of the Badge of Honor in 1976.

Cross-country skiing results
All results are sourced from the International Ski Federation (FIS).

Olympic Games
1 medal – (1 gold)

World Championships
3 medals – (2 gold, 1 bronze)

World Cup

Season standings

References

External links
 
 
 

1950 births
People from Jambyl Region
Olympic cross-country skiers of the Soviet Union
Soviet female cross-country skiers
Cross-country skiers at the 1976 Winter Olympics
Olympic gold medalists for the Soviet Union
Living people
Armed Forces sports society athletes
Olympic medalists in cross-country skiing
FIS Nordic World Ski Championships medalists in cross-country skiing
Kazakhstani female cross-country skiers
Medalists at the 1976 Winter Olympics
Honoured Masters of Sport of the USSR